Milan Basrak (born 24 December 1994) is a Swiss football forward of Serbian origin who plays for Sloga Meridian.

Club career
Born in St. Gallen, Basrak was a member of Zemun, Vojvodina, and Red Star Belgrade youth teams. He made his senior debut for Zemun in the last fixture of 2010–11 Serbian First League, against Novi Pazar, and scored an only goal for Zemun on that match. Later he was with Vojvodina and Red Star Belgrade, where from he left to football club from Sopot. In 2013–14 Serbian First League, he also made 1 appearance for Inđija in the Serbian First League. Season 2014–15 he spent in Bosnia and Herzegovina, where he played for Radnik Bijeljina and Radnički Lukavac. In summer 2015, he joined Metalac Gornji Milanovac. In summer  2016 he moved to Italy and signed with U.S. Catanzaro 1929, scoring 4 goals in 24 matches for the 2016–17 Lega Pro campaign. He also played with Partizani Tirana in the Albanian Superliga in late 2017.

Basrak signed with Birkirkara in Malta in August 2017, but was released again in the beginning of January 2019.

On 21 January 2022, Basrak moved to Italy to join Serie D club Lavello. He successively left Lavello for Sloga Meridian.

Career statistics

References

External links
 
 Milan Basrak stats at utakmica.rs
 
 Milan Basrak at srbijafudbal.com

1994 births
Living people
Sportspeople from St. Gallen (city)
Swiss men's footballers
Association football forwards
FK Zemun players
FK Sopot players
FK Inđija players
FK Radnik Bijeljina players
FK Metalac Gornji Milanovac players
U.S. Catanzaro 1929 players
FK Partizani Tirana players
FK Napredak Kruševac players
Birkirkara F.C. players
1. FC Tatran Prešov players
FK Smederevo players
FK Jagodina players
FK Budućnost Dobanovci players
Serbian SuperLiga players
Serbian First League players
Maltese Premier League players
Serie C players
2. Liga (Slovakia) players
Kategoria Superiore players
Premier League of Bosnia and Herzegovina players
Swiss expatriate footballers
Expatriate footballers in Bosnia and Herzegovina
Expatriate footballers in Italy
Expatriate footballers in Albania
Expatriate footballers in Malta
Expatriate footballers in Slovakia
Expatriate footballers in North Macedonia
Swiss expatriate sportspeople in Bosnia and Herzegovina
Swiss expatriate sportspeople in Italy
Swiss expatriate sportspeople in Albania
Swiss expatriate sportspeople in Malta
Swiss expatriate sportspeople in Slovakia
Swiss expatriate sportspeople in North Macedonia